Mickey Huang Tzu-chiao (born 30 March 1972), also known as Jiao Jiao, is a Taiwanese comedian, television host, Master of Ceremonies and actor. He has worked for many television stations, such as ETTV Drama, CTS, and FTV. He is also a radio DJ, entrepreneur and writer. He is best known for co-hosting the long-running show Super Sunday (超級星期天) in the late 1990s and early 2000s with Chang Hsiao-yen, Harlem Yu and Pu Hsueh-liang. He became Master of Ceremonies for Golden Bell Awards in 2006 and 2017, Golden Melody Awards in 2012, 2015–2017, Golden Horse Awards in 2015-2016 and Golden Note Composition Awards every year since its inception in 2010. He also hosted KKBOX Digital Music Awards from 2010 to 2017 except in 2012.

He married actress Summer Meng on March 5, 2020 after 6 years of dating.

As a writer and Facebook blogger, he has tendencies to write his statuses in long block-form poems with a set number of characters per line.

References

External links 
 

1972 births
Living people
Taiwanese male film actors
Who Wants to Be a Millionaire?
Taiwanese television personalities